St. Joseph's Church is a catholic church in Riga, the capital of Latvia. The church is situated at the address 12/14 Embūte Street.

References

External links 
 

Roman Catholic churches in Riga
Roman Catholic churches in Latvia